Concrete is a town in north-central Skagit County, Washington, United States. It is part of the Mount Vernon-Anacortes, Washington Metropolitan Statistical Area, and had a population of 705 at the 2010 census.

Early history

The town of Concrete has undergone several incarnations, the earliest being a settlement at the northwestern junction of the Baker and Skagit Rivers, known as "Minnehaha."  Amasa "Peg-Leg" Everett was one of the earliest settlers and in 1890, the townsite was platted by another settler, Magnus Miller.  Shortly thereafter, a post office was established and the town name changed to "Baker." In 1905, a settlement across the Baker River came into being due to the building of the Washington Portland Cement Company and was named "Cement City." After the Superior Portland Cement Company plant was built in Baker in 1908, it was decided to merge the two towns. Inhabitants of the new community settled on the name "Concrete" and the town was so christened and officially incorporated on May 8, 1909.

Notable buildings and landmarks
Concrete is home to a number of historic buildings and engineering milestones.

Henry Thompson Bridge

Built in 1916–1918 and so named for the Scottish immigrant, local settler, and Skagit County Commissioner who promoted its construction. The naming occurred after Henry Thompson was killed by a logging train in 1918. At the time, its graceful arch was the longest single-span reinforced concrete bridge in the world or perhaps just in the West and has been listed on the Washington State and National Historic Register since 1976.  Until 1972, when the Washington State Department of Transportation re-routed Highway 20 (then known as Star Route 20) outside the town, the Thompson Bridge was the only connecting thoroughfare across the Baker River and into eastern Skagit County.

The bridge was originally designed by Bowerman and McCloy Consulting Engineers  and built by J.R. Wood Contractors (both of Seattle).  It underwent a complete rehabilitation in 2003-2004.  The engineer for the rehabilitation was Entranco, Inc. of Bellevue (who has since been acquired by AECOM) and the contractor for the rehabilitation was One Way Construction of Sedro-Woolley.

Concrete High School

Concrete High School was built in 1952.  Constructed with the typical and necessary scholastic appointments and one visible and unusual difference:  the central portion of the building was built over the road leading to it.  To make the best use of the property, South Superior Avenue passes beneath the building. The building replaced the previous high school building in the center of town.  The hallways and the wood shop were used during the filming of the Michael Caton-Jones film, This Boy's Life in 1993.  Concrete High School's school colors are purple and gold and their team mascot is the Lion.  CHS's sports teams participate in the Northwest 2B/1A league under the Washington Interscholastic Activities Association. Concrete's Future Business Leaders of America was the fastest growing in the state during the 2012-13 school year.

Concrete Herald building

Located in the heart of Concrete Town Center on Main Street, the Concrete Herald Building was originally built in 1918 as a Model T Ford garage complete with a gas-station out front. When the building was later converted to be the Brommer Logging facility, a large apartment was added to the upper story. It was shortly after this that Concrete Herald owner and editor Charles M. "Chuck" Dwelley took over the building and made it into a modern printing facility and new home of The Concrete Herald (established in 1910). When Robert and June Fader purchased the newspaper upon Dwelley's retirement in late 1970, the building remained the home for the weekly. When the building and newspaper were sold in 1990, the facility became a printing shop until the current owners turned the first floor into a liquor store franchise through the state liquor control board. The Concrete Herald Building has remained a liquor store to this date. As for Concrete Herald, Concrete Mayor Jason Miller has given rebirth to the newspaper after purchasing the Upriver Community News from another local resident. As of May 6, 2009, Concrete Herald began a monthly publication schedule. The newspaper is sold in various locations throughout Skagit County.

Town Hall

Originally built in 1908 as a grade-school, this wooden, clapboard building was originally located on Main Street across from the bank where classes were taught until 1910.  When the building was no longer used as a schoolhouse, it was moved to its present location on West Main Street, next to the current post office.  In its present location, the building has served alternately as a library, senior-citizen center, the city's current town hall with a satellite office for the Skagit County Sheriff's Department.

Concrete Theatre
Originally built in 1923, the stage of the Concrete Theatre has entertained audiences with vaudeville, boxing matches, silent films and later what were known as "the talkies". The building is listed on the Washington Heritage Register  Over the decades, the theatre changed hands many times but retained its original layout as a one-screen movie theatre. In 2009, it was purchased by new owners and refurbished. The venue now seats 130, has a full stage and dance floor, and a refurbished balcony that seats 8. In 2012, the community helped raise funds to purchase a digital projector to keep the theatre alive. In 2021, the Concrete Theatre expanded by purchasing the building next door. Originally the Monrad Grocery built in 1915, the expanded space now features an ice cream parlor, as well as the theatre box office and an additional meeting/screening room.

Lower Baker Dam

It is currently owned, operated, and maintained by Puget Sound Energy.

Author Tobias Wolff spent a large part of his teenage years in the Concrete area.  Wolff's memoir This Boy's Life chronicles his early life living in eastern Skagit County and attending Concrete High School (referred to as "Chinook High School" in the novel). In 1993, the novel was also turned into a feature film starring Leonardo DiCaprio, Robert De Niro, and Ellen Barkin.  The movie's exterior scenes of Concrete (as well as some interior scenes) were filmed in the town of Concrete and the surrounding area and a number of local residents were used as extras. In order to fit the "look" of 1950s-era Concrete, the town itself was transformed back in time "Hollywood style" for the weeks that filming took place in 1992.

Geography

The town lies mostly on the north bank of the Skagit River, and is split into half by the lower Baker River (a tributary to the Skagit River).  Mount Baker, a stratovolcano, lies northwest of Concrete and Mount Shuksan lies almost directly north. Both peaks are part of the North Cascades range.

Climate
The town has a warm summer Mediterranean climate (Csb) with cool winters and warm summers.

Demographics

2010 census
As of the census of 2010, there were 705 people, 295 households, and 179 families residing in the town. The racial makeup of the town was 91.5% White, 0.3% African American, 2.0% Native American, 0.4% Asian, 1.1% Pacific Islander, 1.6% from other races, and 3.1% from two or more races. Hispanic or Latino of any race were 5.5% of the population.

There were 295 households, of which 31.5% had children under the age of 18 living with them, 42.0% were married couples living together, 12.2% had a female householder with no husband present, 6.4% had a male householder with no wife present, and 39.3% were non-families. 29.2% of all households were made up of individuals, and 9.2% had someone living alone who was 65 years of age or older. The average household size was 2.39 and the average family size was 2.93.

The median age in the town was 40.4 years. 26.2% of residents were under the age of 18; 6.4% were between the ages of 18 and 24; 22.4% were from 25 to 44; 32.9% were from 45 to 64; and 12.1% were 65 years of age or older. The gender makeup of the town was 51.2% male and 48.8% female.

2000 census
As of the census of 2000, there were 790 people, 300 households, and 198 families residing in the town. The population density was 650.3 people per square mile (252.1/km2). There were 335 housing units at an average density of 275.8 per square mile (106.9/km2). The racial makeup of the town was 92.78% White, 2.53% Native American, 0.89% Asian, 1.14% from other races, and 2.66% from two or more races. Hispanic or Latino of any race were 2.66% of the population.

There were 300 households, out of which 37.0% had children under the age of 18 living with them, 45.3% were married couples living together, 14.3% had a female householder with no husband present, and 33.7% were non-families. 27.7% of all households were made up of individuals, and 11.7% had someone living alone who was 65 years of age or older. The average household size was 2.63 and the average family size was 3.19.

In the town, the population was spread out, with 34.1% under the age of 18, 5.4% from 18 to 24, 28.6% from 25 to 44, 20.8% from 45 to 64, and 11.1% who were 65 years of age or older. The median age was 33 years. For every 100 females, there were 97.0 males. For every 100 females age 18 and over, there were 100.4 males.

The median income for a household in the town was $29,375, and the median income for a family was $34,464. Males had a median income of $34,083 versus $17,083 for females. The per capita income for the town was $12,492. About 8.4% of families and 14.0% of the population were below the poverty line, including 15.4% of those under age 18 and 8.8% of those age 65 or over.

Transportation
Mears Field (3W5), formerly known as Concrete Municipal Airport, is located one mile south of Concrete at an elevation of 267 ft MSL.

References

External links

 
 Official Concrete Chamber of Commerce website
 Concrete Theatre
 Concrete Herald

Towns in Skagit County, Washington
Towns in Washington (state)
North Cascades of Washington (state)